Jim Dutcher is a former head basketball coach at the University of Minnesota.

Early life and education
Dutcher was born and raised in Alpena, Michigan. He graduated from Alpena High School in 1951 where he was class President and a three sport athlete, earning All-State honors in football and basketball. He attended the University of Michigan, where he received an Elmer Gideon Scholarship to play football and basketball.  A member of the Lambda Chi Alpha fraternity, he majored in physical education, graduating with a B.S. in 1955 and earning an M.A. from the University of Michigan in 1961.  Dutcher joined the Army in 1955, serving as a member of the 3rd Armored Division and was stationed in Frankfurt,  Germany.  He coached and played on the 3rd Armored Division Artillery basketball team while in Germany and also coached offensive line for the Armored Division football team. Dutcher married his high school sweetheart, Marilyn, in 1957.

Early coaching career
Dutcher began his coaching career at Alpena Community College where he served as Athletic Director and head basketball coach culminating in a trip to the National Junior College Tournament in 1966.  He was twice named conference coach of the year.  In 1966, he became the head basketball coach at Eastern Michigan University,  where he was named National Association of Intercollegiate Athletics (NAIA) District Coach of the Year in 1971 and the National Collegiate Athletic Association (NCAA) District 4, Coach of the Year in 1972.

While at Eastern Michigan, his team played in the NAIA National Tournament in Kansas City in 1967, 1968, 1969, 1970 and 1971; and the NCAA College Division Finals in Evansville, Indiana in 1972.  Prominent players Dutcher coached at Eastern Michigan included Kennedy McIntosh, who played with the Seattle SuperSonics; Earl Higgins, who played with the Indiana Pacers; Harvey Marlatt, who played with the Detroit Pistons; and Hall of Famer George Gervin, nicknamed "The Iceman," who played with the Virginia Squires, San Antonio Spurs and Chicago Bulls.

Dutcher became an assistant coach at his alma mater, the University of Michigan, under head coach Johnny Orr.  During the 1974-75 season the team won the Big Ten Championship.

Minnesota head coach
Dutcher took over the Gophers program in 1975 following the departure of Bill Musselman.  The highlight of his time at Minnesota was 1982, a season in which he led the Gophers to the Big Ten Championship — to date, the last "official" conference title for the Gophers — and a Sweet 16 appearance.  He was named the Big Ten Coach of the Year in 1982.

Prominent players coached by Dutcher at Minnesota included Ray Williams, who later played for the New York Knicks; Mychal Thompson, who played for the Portland Trail Blazers and Los Angeles Lakers; Kevin McHale, who played for the Boston Celtics; Trent Tucker, who played for the New York Knicks and Chicago Bulls; Randy Breuer, who played for the Milwaukee Bucks, Minnesota Timberwolves, Atlanta Hawks and Sacramento Kings; Flip Saunders, who became an NBA coach for the Minnesota Timberwolves, Detroit Pistons, and Washington Wizards; Osborne Lockhart, who played for the Harlem Globetrotters; Jim Peterson, who played for the Houston Rockets; Darrell Mitchell, who was named first-team All-Big Ten, and Tommy Davis, also a first-team All-Big Ten player.

On January 25, 1986, three Gopher players were arrested on rape charges in Madison, Wisconsin.  A Madison woman claimed the players raped her at their team hotel hours after the Gophers played the Wisconsin Badgers.  After the arrests, U of M officials canceled the Gophers' next scheduled game, against Northwestern, citing the arrests and a series of less serious incidents prior to the arrests.  Not agreeing with the University's decision to forfeit the game, Dutcher resigned as head coach.  All three players were ultimately acquitted of all charges.

Post-coaching career
Dutcher went on to become a registered financial advisor and became a Senior Vice President for Royal Bank of Canada-Dain.  He retired from RBC in 2005.

Family
Dutcher and his wife Marilyn had four children; son Brian Dutcher is the head basketball coach at San Diego State; daughter Diane McNutt is Vice President of Human Capital at UnitedHealthcare; Judi Dutcher is an attorney, the former Minnesota State Auditor and the CEO of the Bentson Foundation; and Barbara Jacobson is a Director of Market Research at UnitedHealthcare.  Marilyn Dutcher died in 2010.

Head coaching record

% Records are unofficial due to NCAA sanctions from former coach Bill Musselman (0–27,0–18).
^ Team was banned from any postseason tournament in 1976–1978.
$ Dutcher resigned midseason; he was replaced by Jimmy Williams.
& Dutcher's record before the sanctions was (190–113,98–89) but because of the sanctions, it is (166–137,83–89).

References

Year of birth missing (living people)
Living people
American men's basketball coaches
Basketball coaches from Michigan
College men's basketball head coaches in the United States
Eastern Michigan Eagles men's basketball coaches
Michigan Wolverines men's basketball coaches
Minnesota Golden Gophers men's basketball coaches
University of Michigan alumni